Santi Thamasucharit (born 7 April 1951) is a Thai sailor. He competed in the 470 event at the 1976 Summer Olympics.

References

External links
 

1951 births
Living people
Santi Thamasucharit
Santi Thamasucharit
Sailors at the 1976 Summer Olympics – 470
Place of birth missing (living people)
Asian Games medalists in sailing
Sailors at the 1978 Asian Games
Medalists at the 1978 Asian Games
Santi Thamasucharit
Santi Thamasucharit